The Wagon Bed Formation is a geologic formation in Wyoming. It preserves fossils dating back to the Paleogene period.

See also

 List of fossiliferous stratigraphic units in Wyoming
 Paleontology in Wyoming

References
 

Paleogene geology of Wyoming